Clathrodrillia parva is a species of sea snail, a marine gastropod mollusc in the family Drilliidae.

Description
The length of the shell attains the length of 10 mm.

Distribution
This marine species occurs in the Caribbean Sea off Honduras, the Lesser Antilles, and  Saint Vincent and the Grenadines.

References

 Fallon P.J. (2016). Taxonomic review of tropical western Atlantic shallow water Drilliidae (Mollusca: Gastropoda: Conoidea) including descriptions of 100 new species. Zootaxa. 4090(1): 1–363

External links
 

.

parva
Gastropods described in 2016